Vortex Engineering is an India-based technology company that makes self-service transaction systems (such as ATMs) for banks, independent ATM operators and other financial institutions. Vortex also offers products and services for ATM Monitoring and Management.

Vortex ATMs are also now used in several countries outside India, especially in Asia & Africa. Vortex is backed by investors: Tata Capital, Aavishkaar, Ventureast, Oasis and IFC (A World Bank subsidiary).

History
Vortex was founded by an IIT Madras alumni, L.Kannan in 2001. Around 2004-05, they ventured into ATMs. Their first pilot deployment was for disbursal of NREGA wages through their ATMs in Tamil Nadu, in association with IIT Madras in 2008.

They made their first major break though with the winning of an order for 545 ATMs including 300 solar powered ATMs from the State Bank of India. Vortex ATMs are now currently used in almost all states of India. The total ATMs deployed across the globe had reached over 8000.

References

Engineering companies of India